Facebook is a social networking service originally launched as FaceMash on October 28, 2003, before changing its name to TheFacebook on February 4, 2004. It was founded by Mark Zuckerberg and college roommates and fellow Harvard University students, in particular Eduardo Saverin, Andrew McCollum, Dustin Moskovitz, and Chris Hughes. The website's membership was initially limited by the founders to Harvard students, but was expanded to other colleges in the Boston area, the Ivy League, and gradually most universities in the United States and Canada, corporations, and by September 2006, to everyone with a valid email address along with an age requirement of being 13 and older.

FaceMash 
FaceMash was opened in 2003, developed by Mark Zuckerberg and Kye Dow; he wrote the software for the Facemash website when he was in his second year of college. The website was set up as a type of "hot or not" game for Harvard students. The website allowed visitors to compare two students' pictures side by side and let them decide who was more attractive.

While writing the software, Mark Zuckerberg wrote the following blog entries:

According to The Harvard Crimson, Facemash used "photos compiled from the online facebooks of nine Houses, placing two next to each other at a time and asking users to choose the "hotter" person". Facemash attracted 450 visitors and 22,000 photo-views in its first four hours online.

The site was quickly forwarded to several campus group list-servers, but was shut down a few days later by the Harvard administration. Zuckerberg faced expulsion and was charged by the administration with breach of security, violating copyrights, and violating individuals' privacy. Ultimately, the charges were dropped. Zuckerberg expanded on this initial project that semester by creating a social study tool ahead of an art history final exam. He uploaded art images to a website, each of which was featured with a corresponding comments section, then shared the site with his classmates, and people started sharing notes.

On October 25, 2010, entrepreneur and banker Rahul Jain auctioned off the FaceMash.com domain to an unknown buyer for $30,201.

TheFacebook 

A "face book" is a student directory featuring photos and basic information. In 2003, there were no universal online facebooks at Harvard, with only paper sheets distributed and private online directories. Zuckerberg told the Crimson that "Everyone's been talking a lot about a universal face book within Harvard. ... I think it's kind of silly that it would take the University a couple of years to get around to it. I can do it better than they can, and I can do it in a week." In January 2004, Zuckerberg began writing code for a new website, known as "TheFacebook", with the inspiration coming from an editorial in the Crimson about Facemash, stating that "It is clear that the technology needed to create a centralized Website is readily available ... the benefits are many." Zuckerberg met with Harvard student Eduardo Saverin, and each of them agreed to invest $1,000 in the site. On February 4, 2004, Zuckerberg launched it under the name of "TheFacebook", originally located at thefacebook.com.

Zuckerberg intended to create a website that could connect people around the university. Upon finishing the site, Zuckerberg told a couple of friends, one of whom suggested sharing it on the Kirkland House online mailing list, which included several hundred people. According to his roommate, Dustin Moskovitz, "By the end of the night, we were ... actively watching the registration process. Within twenty-four hours, we had somewhere between twelve hundred and fifteen hundred registrants."

Just six days after the launch of the site, three Harvard University seniors, Cameron Winklevoss, Tyler Winklevoss, and Divya Narendra, accused Zuckerberg of intentionally misleading them into believing that he would help them build a social network called HarvardConnection.com, but instead using their idea to build a competing product. The three complained to the Crimson, and the newspaper began an investigation. Zuckerberg knew about the investigation so he used TheFacebook.com to find members in the site who identified themselves as members of the Crimson. He examined a history of failed logins to see if any of the Crimson members had ever entered an incorrect password into TheFacebook.com. In the cases in which they had failed to log in, Zuckerberg tried to use them to access the Crimson members' Harvard email accounts, and he was successful in accessing two of them. In the end, three Crimson members filed a lawsuit against Zuckerberg which was later settled.

Membership was initially restricted to students of Harvard University. Within the first month, more than half the undergraduate population at Harvard was registered on the service. Zuckerberg was joined in the promotion of the site by Saverin (business aspects), Dustin Moskovitz (programmer), Andrew McCollum (graphic artist), and Chris Hughes. In March 2004, Facebook expanded to Stanford, Columbia, and Yale. This expansion continued when it opened to all Ivy League and Boston-area schools. It gradually reached most universities in the United States and Canada. Facebook was incorporated in the summer of 2004, and the entrepreneur Sean Parker, who had been informally advising Zuckerberg, became the company's president. In June 2004, Facebook moved its base of operations to Palo Alto, California.

Facebook  
The company dropped 'The' from its name after purchasing the domain name facebook.com in 2005 for $200,000. The following year, the platform was made available for high school students, and in 2006, it became accessible to the general public.

By December 2005, Facebook had 6 million users.

On October 1, 2005, Facebook expanded to twenty-one universities in the United Kingdom and others around the world. Facebook launched a high school version in September 2005, which Zuckerberg called the next logical step. At that time, high school networks required an invitation to join. Facebook later expanded membership eligibility to employees of several companies, including Apple Inc. and Microsoft. On December 11, 2005, universities in Australia and New Zealand were added to the Facebook network, bringing its size to 2,000+ colleges and 25,000+ high schools throughout the United States, Canada, Mexico, the United Kingdom, Australia, New Zealand, and Ireland. Facebook was then opened on September 26, 2006, to everyone aged 13 and older with a valid email address.

Late in 2007, Facebook had 100,000 business pages, allowing companies to attract potential customers and tell about themselves. These started as group pages, but a new concept called company pages was planned.

In October 2008, Facebook announced that it would set up its international headquarters in Dublin, Ireland.

In 2010, Facebook began to invite users to become beta testers after passing a question-and-answer-based selection process, and a set of Facebook Engineering Puzzles where users would solve computational problems which gave them an opportunity to be hired by Facebook.

As of February 2011, Facebook had become the largest online photo host, being cited by Facebook application and online photo aggregator Pixable as expecting to have 100 billion photos by summer 2011. As of October 2011, over 350 million users accessed Facebook through their mobile phones, accounting for 33% of all Facebook traffic.

On March 12, 2012, Yahoo! filed suit in a U.S. federal court against Facebook weeks before the scheduled Facebook initial public offering. In its court filing, Yahoo! said that Facebook had infringed on ten of its patents covering advertising, privacy controls and social networking. Yahoo! had threatened to sue Facebook a month before the filing, insisting that the social network license its patents. A spokesperson for Facebook issued a statement saying "We're disappointed that Yahoo, a long-time business partner of Facebook and a company that has substantially benefited from its association with Facebook, has decided to resort to litigation". The lawsuit claims that Yahoo!'s patents cover basic social networking ideas such as customizing website users' experiences to their needs, adding that the patents cover ways of targeting ads to individual users. In 2012, Facebook App Center, an online mobile store, was rolled out. The store initially had 500 Facebook apps which were mostly games.

On April 24, 2014, Facebook and Storyful announced a new feature called FB Newswire.

In addition to the Android and iOS mobile app, Facebook developed another Android and iOS app called Facebook Lite which uses less data. Another project from Facebook is called Facebook Zero, which allows users to use a mobile text-only version of Facebook for free, without paying for mobile data when using some mobile network operators.

In May 2018, the company announced their own dating service, called Facebook Dating.

Financials

Initial funding
Facebook was initially incorporated as a Florida LLC. For the first few months after its launch in February 2004, the costs for the website operations for thefacebook.com were paid for by Mark Zuckerberg and Eduardo Saverin, who had taken equity stakes in the company. The website also ran a few advertisements to meet its operating costs.

First angel investment
In the summer of 2004, venture capitalist Peter Thiel made a $500,001 angel investment in the social network Facebook for 10.2% of the company and joined Facebook's board. This was the first outside investment in Facebook.

In his book The Facebook Effect,  David Kirkpatrick outlines the story of how Thiel came to make his investment: former Napster and Plaxo employee Sean Parker, who at the time had assumed the title of "President" of Facebook, was seeking investors for Facebook. Parker approached Reid Hoffman, the CEO of work-based social network LinkedIn. Hoffman liked Facebook but declined to be the lead investor because of the potential for conflict of interest with his duties as LinkedIn CEO. He redirected Parker to Peter Thiel, whom he knew from their PayPal days (both Hoffman and Thiel are considered members of the PayPal Mafia). Thiel met Parker and Mark Zuckerberg, the Harvard college student who had founded Facebook and controlled it. Thiel and Zuckerberg got along well and Thiel agreed to lead Facebook's seed round with $500,000 for 10.2% of the company. Hoffman and Mark Pincus also participated in the round, along with Maurice Werdegar who led the investment on behalf of Western Technology Investment. The investment was originally in the form of a convertible note, to be converted to equity if Facebook reached 1.5 million users by the end of 2004. Although Facebook narrowly missed the target, Thiel allowed the loan to be converted to equity anyway. Thiel said of his investment:

I was comfortable with them pursuing their original vision. And it was a very reasonable valuation. I thought it was going to be a pretty safe investment.

Accel investment (Series A)
In April 2005, Accel Partners agreed to make a $12.7 million venture capital investment in a deal that valued Facebook at $98 million. Accel joined Facebook's board, and the board was expanded to five seats, with Zuckerberg, Thiel, and Accel's Jim Breyer in three of the seats, and the other two seats currently being empty but with Zuckerberg free to nominate anybody to those seats.

Greylock investment (Series B)
In April 2006, Facebook closed its Series B funding round. This included $27.5 million from a number of venture capitalists, including Greylock Partners and Meritech Capital, plus additional investments from Peter Thiel and Accel Partners. The valuation for this round was about $500 million.

A leaked cash flow statement showed that during the 2005 fiscal year, Facebook had a net gain of $5.66 million.

Sales negotiations
With the sale of social networking website MySpace to News Corp on July 19, 2005, rumours surfaced about the possible sale of Facebook to a larger media company. Zuckerberg had already stated that he did not want to sell the company, and denied rumors to the contrary. On March 28, 2006, BusinessWeek reported that a potential acquisition of Facebook was under negotiation. Facebook reportedly declined an offer of $750 million from an unknown bidder, and it was rumored the asking price rose as high as $2 billion.

In September 2006, serious talks between Facebook and Yahoo! took place concerning acquisition of Facebook, with prices reaching as high as $1 billion. Thiel, by then a board member of Facebook, indicated that Facebook's internal valuation was around $8 billion based on their projected revenues of $1 billion by 2015, comparable to Viacom's MTV brand, a company with a shared target demographic audience.

On July 17, 2007, Zuckerberg said that selling Facebook was unlikely because he wanted to keep it independent, saying "We're not really looking to sell the company ... We're not looking to IPO anytime soon. It's just not the core focus of the company." In September 2007, Microsoft approached Facebook, proposing an investment in return for a 5% stake in the company, offering an estimated $300–500 million. That month, other companies, including Google, expressed interest in buying a portion of Facebook.

Microsoft investment (Series C)
On October 24, 2007, Microsoft announced that it had purchased a 1.6% share of Facebook for $240 million, giving Facebook a total implied value of around $15 billion. However, Microsoft bought preferred stock that carried special rights, such as "liquidation preferences" that meant Microsoft would get paid before common stockholders if the company were sold. Microsoft's purchase also included the right to place international ads on Facebook. In November 2007, Hong Kong billionaire Li Ka-shing invested $60 million in Facebook.

Switch to profitability
In August 2008, BusinessWeek reported that private sales by employees, as well as purchases by venture capital firms, were being done at share prices that put the company's total valuation at between $3.75 billion and $5 billion. In October 2008, Zuckerberg said "I don't think social networks can be monetized in the same way that search did ... In three years from now we have to figure out what the optimum model is. But that is not our primary focus today."

Facebook hired Sheryl Sandberg as its Chief Operating Officer in March 2008. Sandberg is reported to have held a number of brainstorming sessions with Facebook employees on their long-term monetization strategy, which led to the conclusion that advertising would be the main source of monetization. Under Sandberg's leadership, Facebook made a number of changes to its advertising model with the aim of achieving profitability. In September 2009, Facebook stated that it had turned cash flow positive for the first time.

In early 2012, Facebook disclosed that its profits had jumped 65% to $1 billion in the previous year when its revenue, which is mainly from advertising, had jumped almost 90% to $3.71 billion. Facebook also reported that 56% of its advertising revenue comes from the United States alone, and that 12% of its revenue comes from Zynga, the social network game development company. Payments and other fees were $557 million up from $106 million the previous year.

Acquisitions
In August 2009, Facebook acquired social media real-time news aggregator FriendFeed, a startup created by Gmail's first engineer Paul Buchheit.

In February 2010, Facebook acquired Malaysian contact-importing startup Octazen Solutions. On April 2, 2010, Facebook announced acquisition of a photo-sharing service called Divvyshot for an undisclosed amount. In June 2010, an online marketplace for trading private Facebook stock reflected a valuation of $11.5 billion.

On April 12, 2012, Facebook acquired photo sharing service Instagram for approximately $1 billion in cash and stock.

On March 8, 2013, Facebook announced that they acquired the team from Storylane, but not the product itself. On October 13, 2013, Facebook acquired Onavo, an Israeli analytics company, for approximately $120 million.

On February 19, 2014, Facebook announced its acquisition of WhatsApp, a smartphone instant messaging application for $19 billion in a mix of stock and cash. The acquisition is the most ever paid for a venture-capital backed startup.

On March 25, 2014, Facebook announced they had acquired virtual reality startup Oculus VR for $2 billion in cash and stock.

Initial public offering

Facebook filed for an initial public offering (IPO) on February 1, 2012. The preliminary prospectus stated that the company was seeking to raise $5 billion. The document announced that the company had 845 million active monthly users and its website featured 2.7 billion daily likes and comments. After the IPO, Zuckerberg retains a 22% ownership share in Facebook and owns 57% of the voting shares.

Underwriters valued the shares at $38 each, pricing the company at $104 billion, the largest valuation to date for a newly public company. On May 16, one day before the IPO, Facebook announced that it would sell 25% more shares than originally planned due to high demand. The IPO raised $16 billion, making it the third largest in U.S. history (just ahead of AT&T Wireless and behind only General Motors and Visa Inc.). The stock price left the company with a higher market capitalization than all but a few U.S. corporations – surpassing heavyweights such as Amazon.com, McDonald's, Disney, and Kraft Foods – and made Zuckerberg's stock worth $19 billion. The New York Times stated that the offering overcame questions about Facebook's difficulties in attracting advertisers to transform the company into a "must-own stock". Jimmy Lee of JPMorgan Chase described it as "the next great blue-chip". Writers at TechCrunch, on the other hand, expressed skepticism, stating, "That's a big multiple to live up to, and [Facebook] will likely need to add bold new revenue streams to justify the mammoth valuation".

Trading in the stock, which began on May 18, was delayed that day due to technical problems with the NASDAQ exchange. The stock struggled to stay above the IPO price for most of the day, forcing underwriters to buy back shares to support the price. At closing bell, shares were valued at $38.23, only $0.23 above the IPO price and down $3.82 from the opening bell value. The opening was widely described by the financial press as a disappointment.
The stock nonetheless set a new record for trading volume of an IPO. On May 25, 2012, the stock ended its first full week of trading at $31.91, a 16.5% decline.

On 22 May, regulators from Wall Street's Financial Industry Regulatory Authority announced that they had begun to investigate whether banks underwriting Facebook had improperly shared information only with select clients, rather than the general public. Massachusetts Secretary of State William Galvin subpoenaed Morgan Stanley over the same issue. The allegations sparked "fury" among some investors and led to the immediate filing of several lawsuits, one of them a class action suit claiming more than $2.5 billion in losses due to the IPO. Bloomberg estimated that retail investors may have lost approximately $630 million on Facebook stock since its debut.

Timeline

See also 
 Timeline of Twitter
 Timeline of Instagram
 Timeline of Pinterest
 Timeline of Snapchat
 Timeline of LinkedIn
 Timeline of social media
 Metaverse

Notes

References

F
Facebook
F